Capus Miller Waynick (December 23, 1889 – September 7, 1986) was an American newspaperman, politician, and diplomat.

Born in Rockingham County, North Carolina, Waynick enrolled at the University of North Carolina at Chapel Hill but did not graduate. He became a reporter for the Greensboro Record and eventually rose to become its publisher, and later editor of the High Point Enterprise. Waynick, a Democrat, was elected to one term in the North Carolina House of Representatives and to one term in the North Carolina Senate. 
He held a variety of offices in the North Carolina state government, managed the successful gubernatorial campaign of Kerr Scott, and was the chairman of the North Carolina Democratic Party in 1948-1949. President Harry Truman appointed him to serve as U.S. Ambassador to Nicaragua (1949–1951) and then to Colombia (1951–1953). Waynick served as adjutant general of the North Carolina National Guard under Gov. Luther Hodges from 1957-1961.

References
Capus Miller Waynick Papers at East Carolina University
Capus M. Waynick Oral History Interview

1889 births
1986 deaths
Members of the North Carolina House of Representatives
North Carolina state senators
Adjutants General of North Carolina
Ambassadors of the United States to Nicaragua
Ambassadors of the United States to Colombia
North Carolina Democratic Party chairs
20th-century American politicians